Anuradha may refer to:

Film 
 Anuradha (1940 film), a 1940 Bollywood film
 Anuradha (1960 film), a 1960 Hindi-language film
 Anuradha (1967 film), a 1967 Indian Kannada film
 Anuradha (2014 film), a 2014 Bollywood drama film
 Anuradha (2015 film), an Assamese language film

Other 
 Anuradha (name), a given name and surname
 Anuradha (nakshatra), lunar mansion in Hindu astrology
 Anuradha (actress), a Bollywood actress

See also
 Anuruddha, disciple and cousin of Gautama Buddha